Enzi Shafira (born 21 May 1997) is an Indonesian male badminton player.

Achievements

BWF International Challenge/Series
Men's Singles

 BWF International Challenge tournament
 BWF International Series tournament
 BWF Future Series tournament

References

External links 
 

Living people
1997 births
Sportspeople from Medan
Indonesian male badminton players
21st-century Indonesian people